Grossite is a calcium aluminium oxide mineral with formula CaAl4O7. It is a colorless to white vitreous mineral which crystallizes in the monoclinic crystal system.

Grossite was first described 1994 for an occurrence in the Hatrurim Formation of Israel. It was named for Shulamit Gross (1923–2012) of the Geological Survey of Israel.

It occurs within high temperature metamorphosed impure limestone of the Hatrurim Formation and also within calcium-aluminium rich inclusions in chondritic meteorites. Associated minerals in the Hatrurium include brownmillerite, mayenite and larnite. In meteorites it occurs with perovskite, melilite, hibonite, spinel and calcium rich pyroxene.

See also
 Glossary of meteoritics

References

Oxide minerals
Monoclinic minerals
Minerals in space group 15
Meteorite minerals